is a 2011 Japanese film directed by Shunichi Nagasaki and it is the sequel to the 2005 film All About My Dog. It opened in Japanese cinemas on 21 January 2011.

Cast
 Akira Nakao
 Atsuko Takahata
 Chiharu
 Katsuhisa Namase
 Kie Kitano
 Maki Sakai
 Mana Ashida
 Masaaki Uchino
 Naho Toda
 Nanako Matsushima
 Nao Omori
 Roi Hayashi
 Shingo Tsurumi

References

External links
  
 

2011 films
Japanese comedy-drama films
2011 comedy-drama films
2010s Japanese films

ja:いぬのえいが#犬とあなたの物語 いぬのえいが